Looking for a Song is a 2CD promo only compilation album by Big Audio Dynamite released in the US in 1994. It comprises Greatest Hits - The Radio Edits and Looking for a Song EP and was issued under the shortened band name Big Audio.

Track listing

Greatest Hits - The Radio Edits
"Looking for a Song" (Radio Mix) - 4:46
"Innocent Child" (Edit) - 3:55
"The Globe" (Edit) - 3:46
"Rush" (Edit) - 3:08
"Free" (Edit) - 3:30
"Contact" (Edit) - 4:12
"James Brown" (Remix Edit) - 3:58
"Other 99" (Edit) - 4:27
"Just Play Music!" (Edit) - 3:56
"Hollywood Boulevard" - 3:57
"V. Thirteen" - 4:38
"C'Mon Every Beatbox" (Edit) - 4:31
"E=MC²" (Edit) - 4:32
"Medicine Show" (Edit) - 4:27
"The Bottom Line" (Edit) - 3:46

Looking for a Song EP
"Looking for a Song" (Album Version) - 3:46
"Mirror Man" - 4:19
"Looking for a Song" (The Zonka/Shapps Remix) - 7:18
"Medicine Show" (Live) - 8:36
"RusH" (Live) - 7:08

Notes
"Mirror Man" (written by Lionel Bart) was previously unreleased and remains exclusive to this release.
The live versions of "Medicine Show" and "Rush" were recorded at the Mick Ronson memorial concert at the Hammersmith Odeon in April 1994.

References

Big Audio Dynamite albums
1994 compilation albums
1994 EPs
Albums produced by Bill Price (record producer)
Columbia Records compilation albums
Columbia Records EPs